The Kowloon Walled City Park is a historical park in Kowloon City, Kowloon, Hong Kong. The Kowloon Walled City had been a military stronghold since the 15th century due to its coastal location and was a centre of vice and crime until 1987. Under the agreement between the Government of Hong Kong and the PRC, the Kowloon Walled City was demolished in the 1990s while the indigenous buildings and features were preserved for incorporation in the new park.

The Kowloon Walled City Park is designed as a Jiangnan (江南) garden of the early Qing dynasty. The park, 31,000 square metres (7.66 acres) in total, is divided into eight theme zones with their own characteristic scenery, matching with the style of the whole park. The design was awarded a Diploma at the IGO Stuttgart Expo 93 (International Garden Exposition).

History
In the middle of the 19th century, the Qing government started to build an enclave beside Kowloon Bay, surrounded by stone walls. The Walled City was initially used for military purposes, housing many soldiers and their families. During World War II, the stone walls were demolished by the Imperial Japanese Army. Part of them were buried and well preserved under the soil. By the 1970s, the population of the city had risen to 41,000. The number of buildings was 503 in 1994. By that time, the British colonial government found it increasingly difficult to manage and control the serious crime in the area related to drugs, illegal gambling, prostitution and quackery. As well, domestic factories, including textile, candy-making and production of jook-sing noodles, were situated in the area. After the Sino-British Joint Declaration in 1984, Britain and China embarked on a discussion about solving the problems in the Walled City, and subsequently announced the demolition of the City on 14 January 1987. Between 1987 and 1989, residents were resettled, and demolition began in 1993.

By 1995, the site had been transformed into a park for nearby residents. Due to its proximity to the Kai Tak Airport, and so that the park could have a more open view, regulation of the height of buildings was strictly enforced.

Featured facilities
The park consists mainly of eight landscape features: the Yamen, Old South Gate, Eight Floral Walks, Garden of Four Seasons, Garden of Chinese Zodiac, Chess Garden, Mountain View Pavilion as well as the Fei Sing Pavilion and Guibi Rock.

The Yamen is located in the centre of the Park and it is the only remaining old Qing building. It was built in 1847 and its interior was dominated by the offices of the Commodore of the Dapeng Brigade and the Kowloon Assistant Military Inspectorate. It was designed with three rows and four wings of houses. Its walls and column bases are built from bricks and granite, while the roof is a traditional structure covered with cylindrical and flat tiles. After 1899, the Yamen was used for charitable purposes like home for the elderly named Almshouse. It is now officially classified as a declared monument in Hong Kong. Six exhibition rooms are housed inside.

The original site of South Gate has been designated as a declared monument and all related relics unearthed have been preserved. Flagstone pavement, cornerstones of the buildings, and a drain were discovered. Also, two granite plaques with Chinese characters for "South Gate" and "Kowloon Walled City" were unearthed at the site of the original South Gate when the Walled City was torn down in 1994.

The Garden features 12 Chinese zodiac sculptures. They are arranged according to the Heavenly Stems (Tiangan 天干) and Earthly Branches (Dizhi 地支) in Chinese astrology.

The Guibi Rock was carved from Taihu stone. It is named Guibi because its veins are similar to those of ancient jade. Fui Sing Pavilion symbolises a constellation of literature and wisdom. Guibi Rock also symbolises the hope of returning Hong Kong to China.

The Mountain View Pavilion provides a fine distant view of the Lion Rock, which resembles a lion sitting with its head facing the Pavilion.

There are four large chessboards built on the ground with pebbles for visitors to enjoy a game of chess.

The Eight Floral Walks is a web of paths which connects the distinct landscape features of the Park. Various types of flowers that bloom in different seasons are planted on both sides of the path to accentuate the scenery of the park in all seasons.

Located to the west of Yamen, the Kwong Yam Square is a garden where flowers of the four seasons could be seen.

This exhibition was officially opened for public use on 19 April 2009. It consists of one outdoor display area and six exhibition rooms inside the former Yamen.

The outdoor display area is located near the South Gate which shows a tablet and a model of the Kowloon Walled City. The front of the tablet has an introductory article inscribed whereas the back presents the cross-section of the pre-demolished Kowloon Walled City and the depiction of the daily lives of its residents. Behind the tablet stands a bronze miniature model of the Walled City which allowed the visitors touch and have a closer look at the City.

Six exhibition rooms are located inside the Yamen which illustrate the living environment inside the Walled City through interactive imagery and sound.

References

External links
 

1995 establishments in Hong Kong
Declared monuments of Hong Kong
Kowloon City
Urban public parks and gardens in Hong Kong